Christiane Ritz dos Santos (born 6 October 1981 in Santa Cruz do Sul, Rio Grande do Sul) is a Brazilian middle-distance runner who competes in the 800 metres and 1500 metres events. She won the bronze medal at the 2003 Pan American Games. In addition, she finished fifth at the 2003 Summer Universiade.

Competition record

Personal bests
Outdoor
400 metres – 54.48 (Pergine Valsugana, Italy, 25 July 2003)
800 metres – 2:00.98 (São Paulo, Brazil, 28 June 2003)
1500 metres – 4:17.68 (Belém, Brazil, 5 May 2002)
Indoor
800 metres – 2:03.61 (Fayetteville, Arkansas, United States, 13 February 2004)

References

External links
Tilastopaja biography

Living people
1981 births
Brazilian female middle-distance runners
Athletes (track and field) at the 2003 Pan American Games
Athletes (track and field) at the 2011 Pan American Games
Pan American Games athletes for Brazil
Pan American Games medalists in athletics (track and field)
Pan American Games bronze medalists for Brazil
South American Games bronze medalists for Brazil
South American Games medalists in athletics
Competitors at the 2014 South American Games
Competitors at the 2003 Summer Universiade
Medalists at the 2003 Pan American Games
Sportspeople from Rio Grande do Sul